Guerrouaou is a town and commune in Blida Province, Algeria.

References

Communes of Blida Province
Blida Province